Aung Zaw (born 5 March 1990) is a footballer from Burma, and a defender for Myanmar national football team. 

He currently plays for Hantharwady United in Myanmar National League.

References

Living people
1990 births
Burmese footballers
Myanmar international footballers
Hanthawaddy United F.C. players
Yangon United F.C. players
Association football defenders